Hafiz Ammar Yasir() is a Pakistani politician who had been a member of the Provincial Assembly of the Punjab from August 2018 till January 2023. He served as Provincial Minister of Punjab for Mines and Mineral from 6 September 2018 to 18 January 2019.

Education
He declared “Hafiz Quran” as his educational qualification.

Political career
He belongs to a humble lower middle class family. He associated himself with Tablighi Jamaat, where he got a chance to develop relations with Chaudhry family of Gujrat.  He was elected to the Provincial Assembly of the Punjab as a candidate of Pakistan Muslim League (Q) from Constituency PP-24 (Chakwal-IV) in 2018 Pakistani general election.

On 27 August 2018, he was inducted into the provincial Punjab cabinet of Chief Minister Sardar Usman Buzdar without any ministerial portfolio. On 6 September 2018, he was appointed as Provincial Minister of Punjab for mines and mineral.

On 18 January 2019, he resigned as Provincial Minister of Punjab for mines and mineral citing pressure on work.

On 21 February 2023, after the dissolution of the Provincial Assembly, Yasir, along with former Chief Minister Chaudhry Pervaiz Elahi and eight other former PML(Q) MPAs, joined the Pakistan Tehreek-e-Insaf (PTI).

References

Living people
Punjab MPAs 2018–2023
Pakistan Muslim League (Q) MPAs (Punjab)
Provincial ministers of Punjab
Year of birth missing (living people)